The UEFA European Under-19 Championship, or simply UEFA Under-19 Championship or the UEFA Euro U-19, is an annual football competition contested by the European men's under-19 national teams of the member associations of UEFA.

Spain and England are the joint most successful team in this competition, having won eleven titles each. England are also the current champions.

History and format  
The competition has been held since 1948. It was originally called the FIFA International Youth Tournament, until it was taken over by UEFA in 1956. In 1980, it was restyled the UEFA European Under-18 Championship. Until the 1997 tournament, players born on or after 1 August the year they turned 19 years were eligible to compete. Since the 1998 tournament, the date limit has been moved back to 1 January. The championship received its current name in 2001, which has been used since the 2002 championship. The contest has been held every year since its inauguration in 1948, except for the period between 1984 and 1992, when it was only held every other year.

The tournament has been played in a number of different formats during its existence. Currently it consists of two stages, similar to UEFA's other European championship competitions. The qualifying stage is open to all UEFA members, and the final stage is contested between eight teams.

During even years, the best finishing teams qualify for the FIFA U-20 World Cup held in the next (odd) year. Currently, five teams can qualify for the World Cup, consisting of the top two of their groups plus the winner of a play-off match between the third-placed teams of each group.

Number of teams

Results

FIFA Youth Tournament (1948–1954)

UEFA Youth Tournament (1955–1980)
{| class="wikitable" style="font-size: 90%; text-align: center; width: 100%;"
|-
!rowspan="2" width="5%"|Year
!rowspan="2" width="10%"|Host
!colspan="3"|Final
!colspan="3"|Third place match
|-
!width="15%"|Winner
!width="10%"|Score
!width="15%"|Runner-up
!width="15%"|Third place
!width="10%"|Score
!width="15%"|Fourth place
|- 
|1955Details
|
|colspan=6|Only group matches were played and no winner was declared.
|- style="background: #D0E6FF;"
|1956Details
|
|colspan=6|Only group matches were played and no winner was declared.
|- 
|1957Details
|
|
|3–2
|
|
|0–0
|Third placewas shared
|- style="background: #D0E6FF;"
|1958Details
|
|
|1–0
|
|
|3–0
|
|- 
|1959Details
|
|
|1–0
|
|
|6–1
|
|- style="background: #D0E6FF;"
|1960Details
|
|
|2–1
|
|
|2–1
|
|- 
|1961Details
|
|
|4–0
|
|
|2–1
|
|- style="background: #D0E6FF;"
|1962Details
|
|
|4–1
|
|
|1–1Czechoslovakia won oncoin toss
|
|- 
|1963Details
|
|
|4–0
|
|
|4–2
|
|- style="background: #D0E6FF;"
|1964Details
|
|
|4–0
|
|
|3–2
|
|- 
|1965Details
|
|
|3–2
|
|
|4–1
|
|- style="background: #D0E6FF;"
|1966Details
|
|
|0–0
|Titlewas shared
|
|2–0
|
|- 
|1967Details
|
|
|1–0
|
|
|1–1Turkey won oncoin toss|
|- style="background: #D0E6FF;"
|1968Details
|
||2–1|
|
|4–2|
|- 
|1969Details
|
||1–1Bulgaria won oncoin toss
|
|
|1–0|
|- style="background: #D0E6FF;"
|1970Details
|
||1–1coin toss
|
|
|2–0|
|- 
|1971Details
|
||3–0|
|
|1–1|
|- style="background: #D0E6FF;"
|1972Details
|
||2–0|
|
|0–0|
|- 
|1973Details
|
||3–2|
|
|1–0|
|- style="background: #D0E6FF;"
|1974Details
|
||1–0|
|
|1–0|
|- 
|1975Details
|
||1–0|
|
| 2–2|
|- style="background: #D0E6FF;"
|1976Details
|
||1–0|
|
|3–0|
|- 
|1977Details
|
||2–1|
|
|7–2|
|- style="background: #D0E6FF;"
|1978Details
|
||3–0|
|
|3–1|
|- 
|1979Details
|
||1–0|
|
|0–0|
|- style="background: #D0E6FF;"
|1980Details
|
||2–1|
|
|3–0|
|}

 UEFA European Under-18 Championship (1981–2001) 

 UEFA European Under-19 Championship (since 2002) 

Statistics
Performances by countries

Note: 

Awards

Golden Player Award
For certain tournaments, the official website UEFA.com subsequently named a Golden Player. 
 

Top goalscorer
The Top goalscorer award is awarded to the player who scores the most goals during the tournament. 
 

Comprehensive team results by tournament at the FIFA U-20 World Cup
Legend
1st – Champions
2nd – Runners-up
3rd – Third place
4th – Fourth placeQF – QuarterfinalsR2 – Round 2R1' – Round 1
     – Hosts
     – Not affiliated to UEFA
q – Qualified for upcoming tournament

See also

UEFA European Championship
UEFA European Under-21 Championship
UEFA European Under-17 Championship

References

External links

 UEFA European U-19 Championship at uefa.com''
 Tournament details at rsssf.com

 
European Under-19 Championship
Under-19 association football competitions
European youth sports competitions
Recurring sporting events established in 1948
1948 establishments in Europe